The 1929 Providence Friars football team was an American football team that represented Providence College as an independent during the 1929 college football season. In their fifth year under head coach Archie Golembeski, the team compiled a 3–3–2 record.

Schedule

References

Providence
Providence Friars football seasons
Providence Friars football